Michael M. Cabonargi (born January 29, 1971) is an American politician and lawyer who formerly served as a commissioner of the Cook County Board of Review from the 2nd district from 2011 until 2022. Since 2019, he has also served as a vice-chair of the Democratic Party of Illinois.

In his early career, Cabonargi worked on the staffs of Illinois U.S. senators Paul Simon and Dick Durbin. He then worked as a law clerk to U.S. District Court judge William J. Hibbler. Thereafter, he entered the private sector, working as a lawyer concentrating in complex commercial and regulatory litigation.

From 2005, until being appointed to serve on the Cook County Board of Review in 2011, Cabonargi worked as senior attorney and prosecutor at the U.S. Securities and Exchange Commission.

Early life and career
Cabonargi was born January 29, 1971.

Cabonargi graduated from Loyola Academy high school in 1989.

In 1993, Cabonargi graduated from Miami University with Bachelor of Arts in both political science and foreign affairs.

From 1993 to 1997, Cabonargi worked as a staff assistant and economic development advisor in the Chicago office of U.S. senator Paul Simon. In 1997, Cabonargi worked as a staff assistant in the Chicago office of U.S. senator Dick Durbin.

In 2000, Cabonorgi received his Juris Doctor from the University of Illinois College of Law with honors.

Cabonorgi worked as a lawyer. From 2002 to 2004, he worked at the law firm of Gardner Carton and Douglas LLP, where he concentrated on complex commercial litigation. During his time at this firm, he defended the City of Chicago in both federal and state litigation deriving from the closure of Meigs Field. From 2004 to 2005, he worked at the law firm of Bell, Boyd, and Lloyd, LLC, where he concentrated on complex commercial and regulatory litigation. While working here, he was also appointed Special Assistant Cook County State's Attorney, defending the Cook County Sheriff's Department against claims of police misconduct.

In 2000, Cabonargi received his Juris Doctor from the University of Illinois College of Law with honors.

From 2000 to 2002, Cabonargi worked  as a law clerk to U.S. District Court judge William J. Hibbler. During his time in this position, he initiated and helped to establish the courts first help desk for pro se litigants. For this, he was given the Award for Excellence in Public Interest Service from the Federal Bar Association and the U.S. District Court.

From 2003 to 2005, he served on the Illinois Comptroller's Ethics Commission.

Work at the U.S. Securities and Exchange Commission
From 2005 until 2011, Cabonargi worked as a senior attorney and prosecutor in the Division of Enforcement at the Chicago Regional Office of the U.S. Securities and Exchange Commission. He brought a $2.8 billion private offering fraud case, at the time the largest private offering fraud case filed by the Commission. For this he was bestowed the Chairman's Award. In 2008, for his work against financial fraud targeting seniors, he was bestowed the SEC Director's Award for Excellence.

Cook County Board of Review
Cabonargi was appointed by Chief Justice of the Circuit Court of Cook County Timothy C. Evans to serve as commissioner of Cook County Board of Review from the 2nd district, after the position was vacated by Joseph Berrios, who had been elected Cook County Assessor. Cabonargi had been selected over several more prominent figures that had expressed interest in the position, including Joseph Mario Moreno and Eugene Schulter. Evans had picked Cabornargi from among 11 candidates. Cabonargi was sworn-in on February 10, 2011.

Cabonargi was reelected, unopposed, in 2012,  2016, and 2018.

In March 2018, Cabonargi's campaign was asked by the Board of Ethics to return $68,950 in funds received from 97 contributions that were in excess of limits.

In 2019, Cabornargi sought more staff for his district.

In 2020, Cabonargi voiced disagreement with a notion expressed by former Cook County clerk David Orr that the Cook County Board of Review has a "longtime pay-to-play culture" and needed reform. Cabonargi argued that existing ethics protocols were sufficient.

Cabonargi has expressed concern over the number of appeals being filed increasing at a rate he has characterized as unsustainable.

In 2022, Cabonargi lost his bid for reelection to the Cook County Board of Review. His loss to political newcomer Samantha Steele was considered an upset to the incumbent Cabonargi.

2020 Clerk of the Circuit Court of Cook County campaign

In 2020, Cabonargi ran to replace outgoing Clerk of the Circuit Court of Cook County Dorothy A. Brown.

Cabonargi was regarded as a frontrunner in the primary.

Cabonargi received the endorsement of the Cook County Democratic Party. He also was endorsed by the Chicago Federation of Labor and Chicago Sun-Times He additionally received endorsements from Dick Durbin, Toni Preckwinkle, and Jesse White.

Cabonargi pledged, if elected, to modernize the office.

During the campaign, all three of Cabonargi's opponents (Richard Boykin, Iris Martinez, and Jabob Meister) accused him of "pay to play". Cabonargi denied any wrongdoing. Jacob Meister further accused him of using his position on the Cook County Board of Review to help generate income for companies his wife worked at. Meister also alleged that he had violated the Cook County ethics ordinance on numerous occasions and had established a "backdoor entity" to get around donation limits. Meiseter filed an ethics complaint against Cabonargi in mid-January 2020 alleging that Cabonargi had accepted $120,000 in improper campaign donations from individuals who had argued property tax appeals before him at the Cook County Board of Review. Cabonargi's campaign claimed the allegations in the ethics complaint were false.

Cabonargi placed second, losing to Iris Martinez, whose victory in the primary was regarded as an upset.

Regional Director of the Department of Health and Human Services
In early 2023, Cabornargi sent an email to colleagues within the Democratic Party to inform them that he would be departing his role in Illinois' State Democratic Central Committee in order to accept an appointment by President Joe Biden to serve as a regional director for the Department of Health and Human Services. The Biden administration has not yet made a formal announcement of this appointment.

Democratic party leadership roles
In 2018, Cabonargi was elected as the Illinois Democratic state central committeeman for Illinois's 9th congressional district. Per the Chicago Tribune's Rick Pearson, as of 2021, Cabonargi was one of the more politically progressive members of the Illinois Democratic State Central Committee.

In 2019, Cabonargi was appointed a vice-chair of the Democratic Party of Illinois. In 2021, Cabonargi supported Robin Kelly in her successful bid to become the chair of the Democratic Party of Illinois.

Cabornargi was a delegate to both the 2012 and 2016 Democratic National Conventions.

Ahead of the 2020 United States presidential election, Cabonargi, with Chicago government affairs consultant Mike Alexander, organized for more than 120 lawyers and other legal professions to travel to the swing state of Michigan, with the goal of helping to assist in enabling a potential victory for the Democratic presidential ticket of Joe Biden and Kamala Harris in the state's vote.

On January 27, 2023, Cabornargi departed his role as a state central committeeman in the Illinois' Democratic State Central Committee in order to accept the position of regional director for the Department Health and Human Services.

Other work
Cabonargi served  on the local school council of the Brentano Elementary School from 2006 to 2008. From 2007 to 2009, he served on the 35th Ward's Zoning Advisory Committee. Cabonargi also formerly served as a member of the University of Illinois College of Law Alumni Board.

Cabonargi was a member of J. B. Pritzker's Governor Elect's Budget and Innovation Transition Committee.

In 2012, Cabonargi was selected to be a fellow with Leadership Greater Chicago.

Cabonargi serves as a board member of the Loyola Academy Bar Association, District 39 Educational Foundation, Joint Civic Committee of Italian Americans, and Milan Committee of Chicago’s Sister Cities Program.

Cabonargi served as a 2020 Democratic United States Electoral College elector from Illinois, casting his votes for Joe Biden as president and Kamala Harris as vice-president.

Personal life
Cabonargi is married to Erin Lavin Cabonargi and has two sons. His wife, Erin, once served as head of Chicago's Public Building Commission. She more recently served as director of construction at Sterling Bay, before leaving to start Hibernian Advisors and Hibernian Real Estate Development in 2018, a consulting firm and a development firm.

In 2011, Cabonargi lived in the Logan Square neighborhood of Chicago. Cabonargi now lives in Wilmette.

Electoral history

Cook County Board of Review
2012

2016

2018

2022

Illinois Democratic State Central Committeeman for the ninth congressional district

Clerk of the Circuit Court of Cook County

References

Illinois Democrats
Members of the Cook County Board of Review
1971 births
University of Illinois alumni
Miami University alumni
People from Wilmette, Illinois
Politicians from Chicago
Illinois lawyers
Lawyers from Chicago
Living people
2020 United States presidential electors